Keisha is a female given name of Hebrew origin, from Keziah. It is considered to be an African-American name in the United States. There may refer to:

Notable people

Keisha 
 Keisha Buchanan (born 1984), British singer-songwriter
 Keisha Lance Bottoms (born 1970), mayor of Atlanta, United States
 Keisha Castle-Hughes (born 1990), New Zealand film actress
 Keisha Jackson (born 1965), American singer
 Heather Keisha Hunter (born 1969), American pornographic actress, rapper
 Keisha White (born 1988), British singer
 Keisha-Dean Soffe (born 1982), New Zealand weightlifter
 Keisha Chalisa Raniya (born 2008)

Kesha 
 Kesha Sebert (born 1987), American singer
 Kesha Wizzart (1988–2007), British singer

Keshia 
 Keshia Chanté (born 1988), Canadian singer-songwriter, model and actress
 Keshia Grant (born 1987), New Zealand netballer
 Keshia Knight Pulliam (born 1979), American actress

Keyshia 
 Keyshia Cole (born 1981), American singer

Keesha 
 Keesha Sharp (born 1973), American actress

Kiesza 
 Kiesza (born 1989), Canadian singer and multi-instrumentalist

Other
 Kesha, a township in Hunan province, China

References